António Alves Martins (18 February 1808 – 5 February 1882) was a Portuguese bishop, professor, journalist and politician, he was bishop of Viseu.

Biography
He joined the Order of St. Francis at age 16, he later went to the University of Coimbra.  In 1828, he was expelled, having been accused for the participation of the Porto Liberal Liberation that took place on 16 May.

He headed Jornal Nacional from 1848 to 1849. In 1852, he became a university professor He became Bishop of Viseu in 1862.

He was also leader of the Reformist Party from 1868 to 1869.  Later he was acclaimed as Minister to the King in the same year and in 1870.

He later lived in Viseu which he remained until his death at Paço do Fontelo, the old Paço Episcopal in the same diocese.

A statue is named in his honor in Viseu.

References

Bibliography
D. Antonio Alves Martins, Bispo de vizeu, Esboço biographico, by Camillo Castello Branco, Ernesto Chardron International Library (LUGAN & GENELIOUX, successores), Porto, 1889]

External links

Official website of Alves Martins Secondary School 

1808 births
1882 deaths
19th-century Roman Catholic bishops in Portugal
People from Alijó
Portuguese journalists
Male journalists
Portuguese politicians
19th-century Portuguese writers
19th-century male writers
Bishops of Viseu